Świerzno may refer to:
Świerzno, Pomeranian Voivodeship
Świerzno, West Pomeranian Voivodeship
Świerzno, Witebsk Voivodeship